El Perdedor may refer to:

 "El Perdedor" (Aventura song), 2006
 "El Perdedor" (Enrique Iglesias song), 2013
 "El Perdedor" (Maluma song), 2016